William Constable may refer to:

Sir William Constable, 1st Baronet (1590–1655), English regicide
William Constable (cricketer) (1851–1894), cricketer
William Constable (designer) (1906–1989), Australian film and stage designer

See also
Constable (surname)